Reece Kershaw is the Commissioner of the Australian Federal Police. He was appointed to the role in 2019 after serving as the Commissioner of the Northern Territory Police. Kershaw began his career with the AFP in 1988.

He was born between 1966–1968.

References
Notes

Citations

Living people
1966 births
Commissioners of the Australian Federal Police
Commissioners of the Northern Territory Police